"Resurrection" is a song by Queen's guitarist Brian May from the album Back to the Light. It was released as a fourth single from the album in 1993.

Overview
The single was released as two different CD versions credited to Brian May with Cozy Powell. It charted at number 23 in the UK.

Resurrection was released as a mini-album in Japan putting together B-sides from the single and adding songs from Star Fleet Project, previously released as B-sides to the "Back to the Light" single.

The single was re-released on 16 July 2021 to promote the re-release and remastering of "Back to the Light."

Track listing
12-inch & CD single 1
"Resurrection" – 4:39  
"Love Token" – 5:27
"Too Much Love Will Kill You" (live version) – 4:42
recorded live at The Palace Theater, Los Angeles, on 6 April 1993

CD single 2
"Resurrection" – 4:39  
"Driven By You Too" – 1:32
"Back To The Light" (live version) – 4:51
recorded live in Los Angeles for The Tonight Show With Jay Leno, 5 April 1993, performed by The Brian May Band
"Tie Your Mother Down" (live version) – 3:30
recorded live in Los Angeles for The Tonight Show With Jay Leno, 5 April 1993, performed by The Brian May Band featuring Slash

Japanese Tour Mini album
"Resurrection" – 4:39  
"Love Token" – 5:27
"Too Much Love Will Kill You" (live version) – 4:42
recorded live at The Palace theater, Los Angeles, on 6 April 1993
"Back To The Light" (live version) – 4:51
recorded live in Los Angeles for The Tonight Show With Jay Leno, 5 April 1993, performed by The Brian May Band
"Tie Your Mother Down" (live version) – 3:30
recorded live in Los Angeles for The Tonight Show With Jay Leno, 5 April 1993, performed by The Brian May Band featuring Slash
"Blues Breaker" – 12:50
"Star Fleet" – 8:06
"Let Me Out" – 7:13
tracks 6–8 performed by Brian May & Friends, taken from the mini-album Star Fleet Project

References

1993 songs
1993 singles
Brian May songs
Parlophone singles
Songs written by Brian May
Hollywood Records singles
1993 EPs
EMI Records EPs